

89001–89100 

|-bgcolor=#f2f2f2
| colspan=4 align=center | 
|}

89101–89200 

|-id=131
| 89131 Phildevries ||  || Phil DeVries (born 1952), an American entomologist who teaches in the Department of Biological Science at the University of New Orleans. Recipient of a MacArthur Fellowship, he published two books on Costa Rica butterflies. || 
|}

89201–89300 

|-id=264
| 89264 Sewanee ||  || The University of the South in Sewanee, Tennessee, home institution of the Cordell-Lorenz Observatory || 
|-id=282
| 89282 Suzieimber ||  || Suzie Imber (born 1983) is a planetary scientist, an accomplished mountaineer, elite sportswoman, and TV personality. She is a direct and powerful inspiration for the next generation through her extensive STEM outreach activities, presenting to many thousands of school children about space exploration. || 
|}

89301–89400 

|-bgcolor=#f2f2f2
| colspan=4 align=center | 
|}

89401–89500 

|-id=455
| 89455 Metzendorf ||  || Wilhelm Metzendorf (1911–1988) was mayor of the district town of Heppenheim in Germany from 1954 to 1973 and was instrumental in the construction of the Starkenburg Observatory. || 
|}

89501–89600 

|-bgcolor=#f2f2f2
| colspan=4 align=center | 
|}

89601–89700 

|-id=664
| 89664 Pignata ||  || Giuliano Pignata (born 1972), an Italian astronomer and a member of the Asiago-DLR Asteroid Survey (ADAS), contributes in a decisive way to the calibration and adaptation of the CCD detector to the telescope. His main research interest is now supernovae, but he still searches for minor planets in supernova survey images. || 
|}

89701–89800 

|-id=735
| 89735 Tommei || 2002 AM || Giacomo Tommei (born 1978), Italian mathematician who carried out research at the University of Pisa on the impact monitoring of near-Earth objects. His research interests in celestial mechanics include the orbit determination and dynamics of NEOs. || 
|-id=739
| 89739 Rampazzi ||  || Francesca Rampazzi (born 1945), an Italian communications specialist, is responsible for communication and editing for the National Telescope Galileo. She is active in the project to digitize the photographic archives of the Asiago Astrophysical Observatory and instrumental in maintaining the Asiago Astrophysical Observatory's ADAS archive. || 
|}

89801–89900 

|-id=818
| 89818 Jureskvarč ||  || Jure Skvarč (born 1964), Slovenian software engineer and a discoverer of minor planets, who created the data-analysis software for the minor planet and comet search project at the Črni Vrh Observatory and in the Astrovirtel survey of the University of Padua. || 
|}

89901–90000 

|-id=903
| 89903 Post ||  || Cecil Post (1917–2013), an American amateur astronomer and former engineer in the antenna section of the physical sciences laboratory in Las Cruces, New Mexico. He was an early and active member of the Astronomical Society of Las Cruces and was a frequent officer, including president, of that organization (Src). || 
|-id=909
| 89909 Linie ||  || Linie, avant-garde association of artists active in Ceské Budejovice, Czech Republic, 1931–1939 || 
|-id=956
| 89956 Leibacher ||  || John Leibacher (born  1941), an American solar astronomer. He is the principal investigator of the Global Oscillation Network Group (GONG) project that studies the physics of the solar interior at six locations around the world. Leibacher is also a former director of the National Solar Observatory. || 
|-id=973
| 89973 Aranyjános ||  || János Arany (1817–1882), a Hungarian writer, poet, journalist and translator, who 0 wrote more than 40 ballads (translated into over 50 languages), as well as the Toldi trilogy, to mention his most famous works. He is considered to be the most literary Hungarian writer || 
|}

References 

089001-090000